Alphamenes usitatus is a species of wasp in the family Vespidae. It was described by Fox in 1899.

References

Vespidae
Insects described in 1899